Otto Bruno Schoenfeld (August 27, 1871 – August 26, 1938) was an all-round sportsman, competing at fencing, wrestling and boxing. Born in 1871 in Leipzig, Germany, he came to the United States as a boy, his family originally settling in Milwaukee, Wisconsin. By the time of his death he was known as 'one of the mightiest amateur athletes of all time'.

Athletic career
He was an all-round sportsman, competing in fencing, wrestling and boxing. 

Fencing
In April 1900 he made his way, unsponsored, to the Exposition Universelle (World's Fair), where he won the world fencing championship. Some months later he competed at the 1900 Summer Olympics for the United States in masters sabre.

High jump
Schoenfeld competed in a professionals-only event at the 1900 Summer Olympics, coming second to Mike Sweeney.

Long jump
He also competed in a professionals-only long jump, again finishing behind Sweeney in second place. As Schoenfeld was a strict amateur it is unclear why he competed in this event.

Wrestling
In wrestling he is best known for fighting Tom Jenkins (twice), Frank Gotch and Charlie Olsen.

Boxing
As a boxer he fought Kid McCoy, knocking him down but eventually losing the bout.

Post-Olympic career
Around 1903 he set up Professor Schoenfeld's Gymnasium and Fencing Academy at 143 Baronne Street, New Orleans.

Personal life
Schoenfeld married Clara Mary Walet in 1903. They had four children - three sons, Otto Bruno Jr, Eugene Morris, Dr Lawrence D., and one daughter, Clara Walet (later Watters). Eugene was also a prominent athlete, but unlike his father he fought professionally; in order that his father didn't find out he competed under the name Jim Feld.

References

External links

1871 births
1938 deaths
Sportspeople from Leipzig
German emigrants to the United States
American male sabre fencers
Olympic fencers of the United States
Fencers at the 1900 Summer Olympics
Olympic track and field athletes of the United States
Athletes (track and field) at the 1900 Summer Olympics